Christopher Burton (born 5 October 1956) is a former professional rugby league footballer who played in the 1970s, 1980s and 1990s.

Playing career

International honours
Chris Burton won caps for Great Britain while at Hull Kingston Rovers in 1982 against Australia, in 1984 against Australia (3 matches), and New Zealand (2 matches), in 1985 against New Zealand (sub), in 1986 against Australia, in 1987 against France.

County Honours

Chris Burton represented Yorkshire in games against Lancashire in 1985 and 1987 and against Papua New Guinea in 1987.

RL Championship Winner

Burton was a member of the Hull Kingston Rovers Championship winning squads of 1983–84 Rugby Football League season & 1984–85 Rugby Football League season

Challenge Cup Final appearances
Chris Burton played right-, i.e. number 12, and scored a try in Hull Kingston Rovers' 9-18 defeat by Widnes in the 1981 Challenge Cup Final during the 1980–81 season at Wembley Stadium, London on Saturday 2 May 1981, in front of a crowd of 92,496.

County Cup Final appearances
Chris Burton played right-, i.e. number 12, in Leeds' 15-6 victory over Featherstone Rovers in the 1976 Yorkshire County Cup Final during the 1976–77 season at Headingley Rugby Stadium, Leeds on Saturday 16 October 1976, in front of a crowd of 7,645

Burton played left-, i.e. number 11, in Hull Kingston Rovers' 12-29 defeat by Hull F.C. in the 1984 Yorkshire County Cup Final during the 1984–85 season at Boothferry Park, Kingston upon Hull on Saturday 27 October 1984, in front of a crowd of 25,237.

Burton played left- in the 22-18 victory over Castleford in the 1985 Yorkshire County Cup Final during the 1985–86 season at Headingley Rugby Stadium, Leeds on Sunday 27 October 1985, in front of a crowd of 12,686.

John Player/John Player Special Trophy Final appearances
Chris Burton played as an interchange/substitute, i.e. number 14, (replacing  Paul Harkin) in Hull Kingston Rovers' 4-12 defeat by Hull F.C. in the 1981–82 John Player Trophy Final during the 1981–82 season at Headingley Rugby Stadium, Leeds on Saturday 23 January 1982, in front of a crowd of 25,245

Burton played left-, i.e. number 11, in the 12-0 victory over Hull F.C. in the 1984–85 John Player Special Trophy Final during the 1984–85 season at Boothferry Park, Kingston upon Hull on Saturday 26 January 1985, in front of a crowd of 25,326

Burton played left- in the 8-11 defeat by Wigan in the 1985–86 John Player Special Trophy Final during the 1985–86 season at Elland Road, Leeds on Saturday 11 January 1986, in front of a crowd of 17,573.

Premiership Final appearances

Burton played as an interchange/substitute, i.e. number 14, in the 11-7 victory over neighbours Hull F.C. in the Final of the 1980-81 Rugby League Premiership during the 1980–81 season 
  
Burton played  Hull Kingston Rovers' 18–10 victory over Castleford Tigers in the Final of the 1983-84 Rugby League Premiership during the 1983–84 season

1983 Hull KR V Queensland

Burton played  Hull Kingston Rovers' 8–6 victory over Queensland as they toured Papua New Guinea and England during the 1983–84 Rugby Football League season

Heritage Number

Hull Kingston Rovers Heritage Number - 814

Club career
Chris Burton was transferred from Hull Kingston Rovers to Featherstone Rovers in exchange for Paul Lyman plus a fee to Featherstone Rovers, he made his début for Featherstone Rovers on Sunday 15 January 1989.

References

External links
!Great Britain Statistics at englandrl.co.uk (statistics currently missing due to not having appeared for both Great Britain, and England)

1956 births
Living people
English rugby league players
Featherstone Rovers players
Great Britain national rugby league team players
Huddersfield Giants players
Hull Kingston Rovers players
Leeds Rhinos players
Place of birth missing (living people)
Rugby league second-rows
Yorkshire rugby league team players